The 2003–04 Segunda Divisão season was the 70th season of the competition and the 54th season of recognised third-tier football in Portugal.

Overview
The league was contested by 59 teams in 3 divisions with SC Espinho, Gondomar SC and SC Olhanense winning the respective divisional competitions and gaining promotion to the Liga de Honra.  The overall championship was won by SC Espinho.

League standings

Segunda Divisão – Zona Norte

Segunda Divisão – Zona Centro

Segunda Divisão – Zona Sul

Footnotes

External links
 Portuguese Division Two «B» – footballzz.co.uk

Portuguese Second Division seasons
Port
3